The Strasbourg Opera House, located on Place Broglie on the Grande Île in the city center of Strasbourg, in the French department of the Bas-Rhin, is the main seat and mother house of the opera company Opéra national du Rhin. It has been classified as a Monument historique since 1921.

History 
After a fire in 1800 that destroyed a previous opera house, also located on Place Broglie, the Strasbourg municipality set up plans for a new one in 1804. As the Napoleonic Empire came and went, the plans for the théâtre municipal  were altered several times, until the building, designed in the Neoclassical style by architect Jean-Nicolas Villot (1782–1857) finally opened to great acclaim in 1821. The monumental façade is adorned by sandstone statues of six muses by Landolin Ohmacht (three muses were left out: Clio, Thalia and Urania), each statue corresponding to a column below.

During the Siege of Strasbourg in 1870, the opera was heavily damaged by Prussian artillery. It was faithfully rebuilt by the architect , who also rebuilt the Hôtel de Klinglin nearby, and reopened in 1873. In 1888, a semi-circular wing was added at the rear by Johann-Karl Ott (1846–1917).

It has seen performances being conducted by Hans Pfitzner, Wilhelm Furtwängler, Otto Klemperer and George Szell.

Gallery

See also 
 
Palais des Fêtes

Literature
Recht, Roland; Foessel, Georges; Klein, Jean-Pierre: Connaître Strasbourg, 1988, page 228

References

External links 

Opéra National du Rhin - 19 place Broglie on archi-wiki.org 

19th-century architecture
Monuments historiques of Strasbourg
Music venues completed in 1821
Music venues completed in 1888
Neoclassical architecture in France
Opera houses in France